Harold Fern (20 April 1881 – 21 August 1974) was the British president of swimming's world governing body, FINA from 1936 – 1948. He was a member of the British Olympic Association.

See also
 List of members of the International Swimming Hall of Fame

References
 

1881 births
1994 deaths
Presidents of FINA
International Olympic Committee members
English sports executives and administrators